The Fatted Calf (French: Le veau gras) is a 1939 French comedy film directed by Serge de Poligny and starring Elvire Popesco, André Lefaur and Armand Bernard. It is based on a play by Bernard Zimmer. The film's sets were designed by Jacques Colombier and Robert Gys.

Cast
 Elvire Popesco as La princesse Dorothée  
 André Lefaur as Jules Vachon père  
 Armand Bernard as Gabriel Vachon  
 Dorville as Le receveur  
 Robert Le Vigan as Grussgolt  
 François Périer as Gaston Vachon 
 Gabrielle Fontan as Madame Vachon 
 Marcelle Praince as Madame Van Houtentook 
 Raymond Cordy as Le curé 
 Nicolas Amato     
 Yvette Andréyor as La mère de Jeanne 
 Andrée Berty    
 Georges Bever as François - le valet de chambre 
 Huguette Boudet   
 Albert Broquin as Le facteur  
 Micheline Buire as Mademoiselle Jeanne  
 Régine Dancourt as Louise  
 Hubert de Malet as Le chauffeur de la princesse 
 Edith Gallia
 Jean Kolb 
 Charles Lemontier as Le juge de paix  
 Nathalie Lissenko as La dame de compagnie  
 Albert Malbert 
 Maurice Marceau as L'ouvrier électricien  
 Jean Marconi as L'entrepreneur  
 Franck Maurice 
 Carine Nelson as Marie - une dactylo  
 Robert Ozanne as L'électricien  
 Jean Parédès as Albert - le garçon de café 
 Henri Richard as Le châtelain  
 Eugène Stuber 
 Solange Turenneas La petite fille 
 Huguette Valmy  
 Claire Vervin   
 Marcel Vidal

References

Bibliography 
 Dayna Oscherwitz & MaryEllen Higgins. The A to Z of French Cinema. Scarecrow Press, 2009.

External links 
 

1939 films
French comedy films
1939 comedy films
1930s French-language films
Films directed by Serge de Poligny
French films based on plays
French black-and-white films
1930s French films